Austmusia is a genus of Australian intertidal spiders first described by Michael R. Gray in 1983.  it contains only three species.

References

Araneomorphae genera
Desidae
Spiders of Australia